The Book of Secrets is the sixth studio album by Loreena McKennitt, released in 1997. It reached #17 on the Billboard 200. Its single "The Mummers' Dance," remixed by DNA, was released during the winter of 1997–98, and peaked at #18 on the Billboard  Hot 100, and #17 on the Modern Rock Tracks chart.
The album is certified double-platinum in the United States. It has now sold more than four million copies worldwide.

Track listing 
All music written by Loreena McKennitt. All lyrics written by Loreena McKennitt except as noted.

 "Prologue" – 4:22
 "The Mummers' Dance" – 6:07
 "Skellig" – 6:07
 "Marco Polo" – 5:15
 "The Highwayman" (lyric by Alfred Noyes, abridged by Loreena McKennitt) – 10:19
 "La Serenissima" – 5:09
 "Night Ride Across the Caucasus" – 8:30
 "Dante's Prayer" – 7:11

Song information 
 The DNA remix of "The Mummers' Dance" was made into a music video.
 "Skellig" relates the dying words of a monk from a monastery that existed during the 6th–12th centuries on the island Skellig Michael (Great Skellig), 11.6 km west of Ireland.
 "The Highwayman" is an adaptation of the poem of the same name by Alfred Noyes.
 "Night Ride Across the Caucasus" appeared in the 1998 film Soldier.
The music from "Night Ride Across the Caucasus" was used in the song Kokli by Ulytau.
 "Dante's Prayer" refers to Dante Alighieri's Divine Comedy.

Personnel 
This information is directly from the sleeve notes.
 Loreena McKennitt – vocals (tracks 1, 2, 3, 4, 5, 7, and 8), piano (track 8), keyboards, harp (track 6), kanun (track 1), accordion (tracks 4, 5)
 Anne Bourne – cello (track 6)
 Aidan Brennan – acoustic guitar (track 3), mandola (tracks 4, 7)
 Martin Brown – acoustic guitar (track 5), mandolin (track 5), mandola (track 5)
 Stuart Bruce – assembled drone (track 1), vocal drone (4)
 Paul Clarvis – snare drum (track 5)
 Nigel Eaton – hurdy-gurdy (track 2, 4)
 Steáfán Hannigan – bodhrán (track 5)
 Nick Hayley – sarangi (track 7), rebec (track 7), lira da braccio (track 7)
 Brian Hughes – oud (tracks 2, 4, 7), electric guitar (tracks 1, 5), acoustic guitar (tracks 4, 5, 7), irish bouzouki (tracks 4, 5, 7), guitar synthesizer (track 4), classical guitar (track 6), vocal drone (track 4)
 Robin Jeffrey – Victorian guitar (track 6)
 Martin Jenkins – mandocello (tracks 3, 4, 5, 7)
 Manu Katché – drums (tracks 1, 2, 4, 7)
 Caroline Lavelle – cello (tracks 2, 5, 8)
 Rick Lazar – percussion (tracks 1, 2, 4, 5, 7)
 Joanna Levine – viola da gamba (tracks 3, 6)
 Hugh Marsh – violin (tracks 2, 3,  4, 5, 6, 7, 8)
 Osama – violin (track 4)
 Steve Pigott – additional keyboards (tracks 3,8)
 Donald Quan – tabla (tracks 2,4,7), timba (track 1), esraj (track 1), viola (tracks 2,4,5,6,8), additional keyboards (tracks 3,4), vocal drone (track 4)
 Hossam Ramzy – percussion (tracks 2,4,5,7)
 David Rhodes – electric guitar (track 2)
 Danny Thompson – acoustic bass (tracks 2,3,4,5,7,8)
 Bob White – tin whistle (track 3), shawm (track 4)
 String Quartet:
 Jonathan Rees – 1st violin (tracks 3,7)
 Iain King – 2nd violin (tracks 3,7)
 Andy Brown – viola (tracks 3,7)
 Chris van Kampen – cello (tracks 3,7)
 Caroline Dale – string arrangements for tracks 3,6,7
 Additional string arrangements – Brian Gascoigne and Doug Riley

Production
As listed in CD booklet:
Produced by Loreena McKennitt; assisted by Brian Hughes & Donald Quan
Recorded & Mixed by Kevin Killen (recorded track 1; mixed tracks 1, 2, 5 & 7) & Stuart Bruce (recorded tracks 2–8; mixed tracks 3, 4, 6 & 8)
Recording & mix assisted by Jacquie Turner, Justin Griffith, Marco Migliara
Mastered by Bob Ludwig
All songs published by Quinlan Road Music, except in Europe, South America & Southeast Asia (Quinlan Road Music/BMG Music Publishing International)

Chart performance

Year-end charts

Certifications

References 

1997 albums
Loreena McKennitt albums
Warner Records albums